RSSL could refer to one of several things:

 Radio Society of Sri Lanka
 Reading Scientific Services Ltd.
 The Radiation and Solid State Physics Lab of New York University
 Reuters Sink Source Library